Saidu Alade Adeshina (born 4 April 1983) is a Nigerian former football midfielder.

Club career
On 3 February 2012 Adeshina was signed by Chiasso.

External links 

FC Sion profile 
Profile at Football.ch

1983 births
Sportspeople from Lagos
Yoruba sportspeople
Living people
Nigerian footballers
Association football forwards
A.C. Reggiana 1919 players
Ternana Calcio players
S.S. Arezzo players
AC Bellinzona players
FC Sion players
FC Schaffhausen players
FC Chiasso players
Serie C players
Serie B players
Swiss Challenge League players
Swiss Super League players
Swiss 1. Liga (football) players
Nigerian expatriate footballers
Expatriate footballers in Italy
Nigerian expatriate sportspeople in Italy
Expatriate footballers in Switzerland
Nigerian expatriate sportspeople in Switzerland